The 2011 season saw Somerset County Cricket Club competing in three domestic competitions; the first division of the County Championship in which despite being within a shout of winning the Championship with two games to go a lack of consistency cost them and they finished 4th, and reached the finals of both one day domestic competitions the Clydesdale Bank 40 and the Friends Life t20. While in international competitions they failed to make it past the group stage in the Caribbean Twenty20 but impressed in the Champions League Twenty20 reaching the semi-finals.

They were captained for the second season by former England international, Marcus Trescothick, who topped the batting table scoring over 2,500 runs saw him named as both Professional Cricketers' Association (PCA) Player of the Year and the PCA's Most Valuable Player of the Year.

Background
The 2010 season yet again saw Somerset fall short in all domestic competitions finishing runners-up in each including finishing on equal points with champions Nottinghamshire in the County Championship and losing the Twenty20 competition on losing more wickets than champions Hampshire.

Somerset started the season as many people's favourites for the County Championship title, and many praised the signings of Gemaal Hussain, Steve Kirby, Ajantha Mendis and George Dockrell. Both Hussain and Kirby signed from Gloucestershire to replace the loss of Ben Phillips to Nottinghamshire, Mark Turner to Derbyshire and Zander de Bruyn to Surrey with Michael Munday, Robin Lett and David Stiff were all released. While Mendis was brought in to cover while Murali Kartik and Alfonso Thomas are playing in the IPL both for Pune Warriors India and Kieron Pollard was brought in for the Friends Life t20 again with Roelof van der Merwe in addition for the first half of the competition while Pollard was on international duty with the West Indies. As well as these new players Alex Barrow, Calum Haggett and Craig Meschede were promoted from the club's academy and all featured in the first team as well as other débutants Adam Dibble and Lewis Gregory.

Squad
The following players made at least one appearance for Somerset in first-class, List A or Twenty20 cricket in 2011.  Age given is at the start of Somerset's first match of the season (14 April 2011).

Notes

Caribbean Twenty20

By finishing as runners-up in the 2010 Friends Provident t20, Somerset should have qualified for the 2010 Champions League Twenty20 but no English county sides were allowed to take part due to a clash with the end of the domestic season. So both winners Hampshire and Somerset were invited to compete in the 2010–11 Caribbean Twenty20 in January 2011.

Somerset named a relatively strong side with a mixture of youth and experience but without captain Marcus Trescothick and wicketkeeper Craig Kieswetter so the side were captained by Alfonso Thomas and these missing players provided a chance for Somerset débuts for George Dockrell, Calum Haggett, Gemaal Hussain, Steve Kirby and Craig Meschede. Somerset lost their first match against Guyana, who elected to bat first but with only two batsmen scoring double figures, Somerset strangled them to just 112/8 from their 20 overs with Alfonso Thomas taking 3-23 but after cruising to 105/3 off 18 overs Somerset looked to be in total control but then collapsed to lose 7 wickets for just 6 runs and therefore lost by a single run. Their second match against the Windward Islands was more successful with an allround bowling beformance coasting to a 17 run victory, Somerset scored 139/4 with Jos Buttler top scoring with 47 and the Windward Islands finished on 122/9 with Max Waller taking 3-16. In contrast in the next game, a contest reduced to 6 overs a side due to rain Jamaica scored 85 at 14.16 an over with only Waller taking a wicket and in reply Somerset scored just 24, losing by a whopping 61 runs. In their final game with no realistic chance of qualification Somerset scored 165/4 with James Hildreth top scoring with 69 aided by Nick Compton's 44 and an 11 ball 26 from Craig Meschede and in reply Combined Campuses and Colleges were restricted to 123/7 with Steve Kirby taking 3-26.

Season standings
Note: Pld = Played, W = Wins, T = Ties, L = Losses, Pts = Points, NRR = Net run rate.

Match logs

Batting averages

Bowling averages

County Championship

Season standings
Note: Pld = Played, W = Wins, L = Losses, D = Draws, T = Ties, A = Abandonments, Bat = Batting points, Bwl = Bowling points, Adj = Adjustments/Penalties, Pts = Points.

Match log

Batting averages

Bowling averages

Clydesdale Bank 40

The 2011 Clydesdale Bank 40 saw Somerset finish as runners-up to Surrey in the Lord's final for the second year in succession. Somerset qualified for the semi-finals by topping their qualification group and securing a home semi against Durham, Somerset bowled their opponents out for just 219 and they strolled to 165 for 3 when bad weather ended the match with Somerset 39 runs ahead using Duckworth-Lewis. In the final after electing to bat, only Jos Buttler impressed with an impressive 86 dragging Somerset to a below par total of 214 all out, and after a few rain breaks Surrey required 186 from 30 overs and reached that total with 15 balls and 5 wickets to spare.

Season standings
Note: Pld = Played, W = Wins, L = Losses, T = Ties, NR = No result, Pts = Points, NRR = Net run rate.

Knockout stages

Match logs

Batting averages

Bowling averages

Friends Life t20

In the 2011 Friends Life t20 saw Somerset finish as runners-up to Leicestershire, reaching the final for the third year in succession. Somerset qualified for the knockout stage having finished fourth in their southern qualification group, to meet Nottinghamshire in the quarter-finals who they beat by five wickets to qualify for finals day. The semi-final against Hampshire was a rematch of the 2010 final and after a tied match decided using Duckworth-Lewis, Somerset won courtesy of a Super Over and reached the final against Leicestershire but despite restricting Leicestershire to 145 but the star studded batting line-up failed with only Peter Trego making 35 as Somerset lost for the third year running by 18 runs.

The season started with a rerun of the 2010 final with a match against Hampshire at the Rose Bowl, but despite a half-century from Peter Trego Somerset lost heavily by 7 wickets and although Somerset recovered with comprehensive victories over Kent and Middlesex bad weather hampered any chance of getting a run of home victories with only three out of seven matches completed at the County Ground. After a defeat away at Sussex, Marcus Trescothick scored a century in a massive 143 run victory away at Essex in one of his two man of the match performances. In Somerset's away victory at Glamorgan occasional spinner Arul Suppiah took new world record Twenty20 bowling figures of 6 for 5 in just 3.4 overs. A lack of consistency harmed Somerset's chance of a home quarter-final with the final game against Middlesex typifying their indifferent bowling where despite Middlesex needing to score 18 off the final over, Somerset failed to win and so finished fourth in the South Division.

Somerset were drawn away at Trent Bridge against Nottinghamshire in the quarter-finals, Notts won the toss and elected to bat and scored an impressive total of 170 with Alex Hales top scoring with 78, Somerset started their innings slowly and it seemed they wouldn't get anywhere near their target and needed 64 off the final 31 deliveries but with Kieron Pollard and Jos Buttler at the crease they crossed the line with five balls remaining. That victory meant a third successive finals day and a rematch with Hampshire yet again and with bad weather looming Somerset won the toss and elected to field first hoping to take advantage of batting second with the Duckworth–Lewis method. Expensive bowling from the spinners and Pollard, Hampshire reached 138 off 15.5 overs propelled by 80 off just 41 balls from Shahid Afridi, with rain ending their innings one ball early Somerset were set a challenging 95 to win off just 10 overs and despite a cameo from Buttler Somerset fell one run short and required a Super Over to decide the match. Somerset sent in Kieswetter and Buttler for their over and scored 16 off Afridi's over and Alfonso Thomas restricted Hampshire to just 5-1 in their one over. In the final against Leicestershire, Somerset restricted them to 145 for 6, and despite no team ever having defended a lower total in an English Twenty20 final none of Somerset's batsman made a large score and they lost by 18 runs.

West Indies star Kieron Pollard returned as an overseas player but missed the first half of the Twenty20 campaign and was replaced by South African all-rounder Roelof van der Merwe.

Season standings
Note: Pld = Played, W = Wins, L = Losses, T = Ties, NR = No result, Adj = Adjustments/Penalties, Pts = Points, NRR = Net run rate.

Knockout stages

Match logs

Batting averages

Bowling averages

Champions League Twenty20

By finishing as runners-up in the Friends Life t20, Somerset qualified to compete in the 2011 Champions League Twenty20, for the second time. Somerset faced squad problems in the buildup to the tournament with Marcus Trescothick no longer travelling overseas due to health reasons, Kieron Pollard choosing his IPL franchise Mumbai Indians over Somerset and both wicket-keepers Jos Buttler and Craig Kieswetter missing due to international commitments for the first two matches.

Qualifier stage standings
Note: Pld = Played, W = Wins, L = Losses, NR = No result, Pts = Points, NRR = Net run rate.

Group stage standings

Knockout stages

Match logs

Batting averages

Bowling averages

Tourist match

India rested a number of their Test players for their first match of their tour; Mahendra Singh Dhoni, Ishant Sharma, Praveen Kumar and Harbhajan Singh were all left out of the team. The weakened bowling attack showed on the first day of the match, when Somerset scored 329 for the loss of two wickets from a rain-reduced 75 overs. Andrew Strauss, the England Test captain and Middlesex player, opened the innings as a guest batsman for Somerset, showed aggression initially, scoring 78 runs out of an opening partnership of 101, before getting out. Andrew McGlashan, summarising the day for ESPNcricinfo, described his innings as "commanding", and his shots "in good working order". After Strauss' dismissal, his opening partner Arul Suppiah began to score more freely, and reached his century off 179 balls, scoring his second 50 from just 57 deliveries. Suppiah and Nick Compton put on a second wicket partnership of 223 before Compton was dismissed for 88. Suppiah reached 156, his highest first-class score before he was out, and Somerset eventually declared their innings closed at 425/3.

In reply, the Indians struggled with the bat during the second, rain affected day; Somerset's Charl Willoughby took five wickets against a batting line-up which showed its lack of match practice and Craig Meschede took the wicket of Sachin Tendulkar for his first first-class wicket. On the third morning, Suresh Raina controlled the strike well to bat his way to a century and stake his claim for a place in first Test, dominating a final wicket partnership of 84. Somerset once more look assured with the bat during their second innings, in which Strauss reached a century, eventually finishing 109 not out, and Peter Trego scored a rapid 85 runs from 57 balls. Somerset declared at tea on the final day, leaving India only a short period to bat in the second innings. The match finished as a draw, but Somerset coach Andrew Hurry suggested that Somerset had "bullied" India, and that it had been "a perfect three days" for Strauss.

Match log

Statistics

Batting

Bowling

Fielding

Wicket Keeping

References

2011 in English cricket
Somerset County Cricket Club seasons